Pleasant Point may refer to:

Places 
In Canada
 Pleasant Point, Nova Scotia

In New Zealand
 Pleasant Point, New Zealand

In the United States
 Pleasant Point, Lincoln County, Kentucky
 Passamaquoddy Pleasant Point Reservation, at Pleasant Point, Maine
 Pleasant Point (Scotland, Virginia), a historic home

See also 
 Point Pleasant (disambiguation)